Dans ma paranoïa is the debut album of Marseille-based French hip hop  artist Jul. It was released on the independent record label Liga One Industry / Musicast on 24 February 2014. The 17-track album contains four collaborations with other artists on the label, two with Kalif Hardcore, and one each with Soso Maness and Kamikaz.

Track list
"Winners" (2:04)
"Malade" (feat. Kalif Hardcore) (3:33)
"Dans mon dél" (3:29)
"Grillé" (2:56)
"J'oublie tout" (5:16)
"Au quartier" (3:19)
"Jeune de cité" (feat. Soso Maness) (4:07)
"Sort le cross volé" (4:18)
"N'importe quoi" (4:11)
"Dans ma paranoïa" (2:40)
"Tu la love" (3:32)
"T'es pas le seul" (feat. Kamikaz) (3:36)
"C'est trop" (2:43)
"Audi volée" (feat. Kalif Hardcore) (3:28)
"Tout seul" (2:27)
"Le sang" (4:43)
"Mon son vient d'ailleurs" (3:56)

Charts

Weekly charts

Year-end charts

References

2014 debut albums
French-language albums